The Egyptian Ministry of Military Production is responsible for managing the development and operation of military factories in the Arab Republic of Egypt and now chaired by Major General Engineer Ibrahim Younis, who took over the ministry within the ministry of Ibrahim Mahlab in February 2014.

Military Production
Military of Egypt